Nichlas Hindsberg (born 7 May 1975) is a retired Danish football midfielder.

References

1975 births
Living people
Danish men's footballers
Viborg FF players
Lyngby Boldklub players
FC Nordsjælland players
Hammarby Fotboll players
Association football midfielders
Danish Superliga players
Allsvenskan players
Danish expatriate men's footballers
Expatriate footballers in Sweden
Danish expatriate sportspeople in Sweden
Footballers from Copenhagen